The Aryan Circle is a white supremacist, Neo-Nazi prison gang spread throughout many U.S. correctional facilities.

The Aryan Circle was founded by Mark "Cowboy" Gaspard in 1983 at the Fort Worth Stock Show And Rodeo as a support family to the well established New Aryan Empire .The Aryan Circle was founded to maintain criminal gang status and white supremacist beliefs, and to oppose African American and Hispanic prison gangs.

The gang began growing during the 1990s, becoming the second-largest prison gang in Texas by 2008, with 730 confirmed members in state prisons. The gang also had an operational presence in neighboring states and isolated members throughout the country. The Anti-Defamation League estimated their 2009 nationwide membership to be approximately 1,400, including 150 confirmed members in federal prisons.

Membership and identifiers

Membership in the group usually requires an assault on an enemy of the organization. The Aryan Circle touts four tenets: brotherhood, solidarity, loyalty, and dedication; these beliefs are represented on each side of a diamond patch.

Aryan Circle members sport common white supremacist/separatist tattoos such as swastikas, SS lightning bolts, and Celtic or Germanic symbols. The main patch of the Aryan Circle is a diamond with wood in grade under the heart with a swastika and the letters "AC" in the center of a circle. However, due to the group being classified as a Security Threat Group, many of its members no longer have the patch tattooed. Older members will have a small circle just below their left pectoral. They also acknowledge each other with patch numbers.

Criminal activities 

Aryan Circle members have been convicted of conspiracy to manufacture and distribute large amounts of methamphetamine.

On August 10, 2007, Aryan Circle member Dennis Leighton Clem killed two police officers at a Budget Inn Motel in Bastrop, Louisiana in a shootout, in which he was also killed. Clem and his girlfriend were on the run after Clem shot at an SUV with black teenagers who had opened fire on an acquaintance, wounding him seriously, in front of his house in Houston on July 14. Two of the assaulting teenagers were killed, one was wounded.

Rivals
Although the Aryan Circle was created by white supremacists, in the mid-1990s it was caught up in a bloody war with another white supremacist prison gang called the White Knights that cost the life of one White Knights member.

See also
New Aryan Empire

References

External links
FBI file on Aryan Circle at the Internet Archive

Organizations established in 1985
1985 establishments in Texas
Neo-Nazi organizations in the United States
 White-supremacist organized crime groups in the United States
 Prison gangs in the United States
 Gangs in Texas
 White nationalism in Texas